The IX monogram or XI monogram is a type of early Christian monogram looking like the spokes of a wheel, sometimes within a circle.

The spokes can also be standalone, without the circle. These monograms can often be found as ancient burial inscriptions.

Gallery

See also
 Ichthys
 Chi Rho
 Christogram

References

Works cited 

 

Greek ligatures
Christian symbols
Monograms